The C&C 30 is a series of Canadian and American sailboats, that was first built in 1973.

The C&C 30 molds are thought to have been used to create the Lancer 29 Mark III and the Lancer 30 Mark II in 1977.

Production
The initial models were built by C&C Yachts of Niagara on the Lake, Ontario, in Canada. The newest model, the C&C 30 One Design, was built by USWatercraft, LLC under the C&C brand, in Newport, Rhode Island until their entry into receivership in July 2017.

Design
The C&C 30 series are all recreational and racing keelboats, built predominantly of fibreglass, with wood trim. There have been four boats to carry the C&C 30 designation, each a completely different design.

Variants
C&C 30-1 (Mark 1)
This model was designed by Cuthbertson & Cassian, introduced in 1973 and over 800 were built. The boat was initially fitted with a Universal Atomic 4 gasoline engine. This was replaced with a Japanese Yanmar QM15 diesel engine and later a Yanmar 2GM diesel. Later boats built had a large number of small changes to the design, including new windows and rudder mounts

Robert Ball commented on the C&C 30 Mk.1, noting George Harding Cuthbertson's guidance:

The C&C 30 was my first Lines Drawing, but it was Big George telling me what to do.
The design was very much a development of the 27.
Once we started being able to actual 'compare' the stability of different designs- it turns out the 30 is the most stable boat we ever did. 
Listening to owners over the years, the boat is stable and tough (indestructible) and will last forever

In a review for Canadian Yachting John Boros wrote, "Production began in 1973 and ceased in 1985 -- a 12-year period that represents the longest production run of any single design version in the history of C&C Yachts.
Although more 27s were built, in excess of 1,000, over a similar 12-year production period, with four distinct design phases, the 27 underwent comparatively continual change in relation to the 30, having only the one design version.

According to Steve Kiemele, of South Shore Yachts, "The 30 didn't need any changes, it held its appeal. This makes it 'The Classic'."

C&C 30-2 (Mark 2)
This later model was designed by Robert W. Ball and introduced in 1988. The boat is fitted with a Japanese Yanmar 2GM diesel engine. The boat has a PHRF racing average handicap of 144 with a high of 144 and low of 147.

C&C 30 One Design
This model was introduced as a one design racer, designed by Mark Mills and was in production in 2017. The hull is made from  Vinylester, E-glass with foam core, resin-infused carbon reinforced structure and features a retractable bowsprit. The fuel tank holds .

Operational history
In a review Michael McGoldrick wrote, "The C&C 30 probably did more than any other boat to establish the 30 foot size range in the minds of many Canadian sailors. Like the C&C 27, it also has to be considered a classic among the production fiberglass boats built in the country. In fact, its appearance and layout is very similar to the C&C 27, just more of everything, including some extra elbow room down below. This is a well built boat with good performance, and it did much to elevate C&C to the status of one of North America's premier sailboat manufacturers during the 1970s and 1980s."

See also

List of sailing boat types

Similar sailboats
Alberg 30
Alberg Odyssey 30
Annie 30
Aloha 30
Bahama 30
Bristol 29.9
C&C 1/2 Ton
C&C 30 Redwing
Catalina 30
Catalina 309
CS 30
Grampian 30
Hunter 30
Hunter 30T
Hunter 30-2
Hunter 306
J/30
Kirby 30
Leigh 30
Mirage 30
Mirage 30 SX
Nonsuch 30
O'Day 30
Pearson 303
S2 9.2
Santana 30/30
Seafarer 30
Southern Cross 28
Tanzer 31

References

External links

Keelboats
1970s sailboat type designs
Sailing yachts
Sailboat type designs by C&C Design
Sailboat type designs by Robert W. Ball
Sailboat types built by C&C Yachts